There are currently twelve institutions directly under the Central Commission for Discipline Inspection of the Chinese Communist Party. Of the twelve institutions, three are journals.

Institutions

Before reorganization in 2014

External links
 Organization of the Central Commission for Discipline Inspection

Central Commission for Discipline Inspection
Organizations established in 1979
1979 establishments in China